...Allow Us to Be Frank, a Rat Pack tribute, is the fifth studio album, sixth major album release under Sony BMG and first cover album by Irish boy band Westlife; it is also the first album since the departure of Brian McFadden and as a four-piece. It was released on 8 November 2004, and peaked at number two in Ireland and number three in the United Kingdom. ...Allow Us To Be Frank was number twenty-four on the 2004 year-end album charts. The album features songs made popular by Frank Sinatra such as "The Way You Look Tonight", "Come Fly with Me", "Moon River", "Summer Wind" and "That's Life". It also includes the Nat "King" Cole song, "When I Fall in Love". It was recorded with a 60-piece orchestra at Phoenix Studios in Wembley, in the London Borough of Brent.

Singles
"Smile" was released as the album's first single on 4 November 2004. The physical single features the video and B-sides "White Christmas" and "When I Fall in Love". It charted at number 37 in Sweden.

"Fly Me to the Moon" was released as the album's second single on 20 December 2004. The single was only released digitally, featuring the video, as well as an exclusive B-side, "Beyond the Sea", which does not feature on the album.

"Ain't That a Kick in the Head" was released as the album's third and final single on 6 January 2005. The physical single features the video, as well B-side "Moon River". It peaked at number 5 in Denmark, number 20 in Sweden, number 41 in the Netherlands and number 43 in Europe. While "Moon River" charted at No. 221 in Russia.

Track listing

On the Japanese edition, the song The Way You Look Tonight is in two versions: the Westlife version is track 5, and the duet with Joanne Hindley is bonus track 14.

Credits

 Band recorded at Whitfield Street Studios, London
 Vocals recorded at Rokstone Studios, London
 Bass guitar:Steve Pearce
 Vocals (track 5):Joanne Hindley
 Backing vocals (track 13): Katie Kissoon Tessa Niles
 Background vocal arrangement:Andy CaineSteve Mac
 Arrangement and piano: Dave Arch
 Design and art direction: Stylorouge
 Bass: Allan Walley Leon Bosch
 Cello: Catchy Giles Gillian Thoday Martin Loveday Nick Cooper
 Double bass: Paul Morgan
 Drums: Ralph Salmins
 Mix assistant engineer: Daniel Pursey
 Mix engineer: Ren Swan
 Pro Tools engineer: Chris Laws Devin Workman Ren Swan
 Guitar: John Parricelli Mitch Dalton
 Horns: Dave Lee Jim Rattigan Paul Gardham Richard Watkins
 Mastering: Dick Beetham
 Percussion: Gary Kettel Glynn Matthews
 Photography: James Bareham
 Band recording: Mike Ross-Trevor
 Vocal recording: Chris Laws Daniel Pursey Steve Mac
 Alto saxophone, flute: Andy Macintosh Phil Todd
 Baritone saxophone, bass clarinet, flute:Alan Barnes
 Tenor saxophone, clarinet, flute: Andy Panayi
 Tenor saxophone, flute: Dave Bishop
 Bass trombone: Richard Edward
 Tenor trombone: Chris Dean Mark Nightingale Pete Beachill
 Trumpet: Andy Greenwood Derek Watkins Simon Gardner Steve Sidwell
 Viola:Andy Parker Edward Vanderspar Garfield Jackson Kathy Burgess Nick Barr Vicci Wardman
 Violin:David Angel Debbie Widdup Douglas MacKie Gillian Cohen Marcus Barcham-Stevens Martin Burgess Michael McMenemy  Paul Manley Perry Montague-Mason Peter Oxer Ralph De Souze Rebecca Hirsch Roger Garland Simon Baggs Steve Morris Wilf Gibson

Source: Discogs

Charts

Weekly charts

Year-end charts

Certifications and sales

Release history

Supporting tour

References

External links
 Official Westlife Website

2004 albums
Westlife albums
Frank Sinatra tribute albums
Covers albums
Albums produced by Steve Mac
Sony BMG albums
RCA Records albums